The term Puig government may refer to:

First government of Ximo Puig, the government of the Valencian Community under Ximo Puig from 2015 to 2019.
Second government of Ximo Puig, the government of the Valencian Community under Ximo Puig from 2019.